In the National Basketball Association and Women's National Basketball Association, the General Manager or GM of a team typically controls player transactions and bears the primary responsibility on behalf of the team during contract negotiations with players.

The general manager is also normally the person who hires and fires the coaching staff, including the head coach.

The exact title and responsibilities held by a general manager can vary from team to team. Some teams choose to have both a general manager and a President of Basketball Operations. For example, when Red Auerbach was team president of the Boston Celtics in the 1980s, Jan Volk, the team's GM from 1984-1997, reported to Auerbach regarding basketball-related decisions. Others, such as the Minnesota Lynx of the WNBA, have a general manager who is also Chief Executive Officer of the organization, effectively reporting only to the owner. Still others will place player personnel decisions in the hands of a head coach; for example, when Don Nelson became coach of the Milwaukee Bucks in 1976, he also became its general manager. In these cases, coaching staffs generally report to a different executive officer within the organization.

See also
NBA Executive of the Year Award
Sports Illustrated Best GM of the Decade (2009)

References